Silent Invasion: China's Influence in Australia is a 2018 book by Clive Hamilton and is about the growing influence of the Chinese Communist Party (CCP) in Australian politics and civil society. The book details the systematic attempt by the government of the People's Republic of China to expand its espionage network and influence in Australia.  The author alleges that this is causing "the erosion of Australian sovereignty".

Publication

Original 
In the book's initial publication in November 2017 was delayed due to legal concerns by the initial publishers, Allen & Unwin, that they “would be targeted by Beijing and its proxies in Australia.” The book was published after Hardie Grant Books agreed to publish the book.

Chinese translation 
The Chinese translation is not available in Simplified Chinese but available in Traditional Chinese, and it was published by Zuoan Wenhua Publishing as Silent Invasion: The China Factor in Australia (無聲的入侵：中國因素在澳洲) on March 20, 2019.

Japanese translation 
The Japanese translation was published by Asuka Shinsha Publishing as Invisible Invasion: The China’s Campaign to Control Australia (目に見えぬ侵略 中国のオーストラリア支配計画) on May 28, 2020.

Korean translation 
The Korean translation was published by Sejong Books as China's Quiet Invasion (중국의 조용한 침공) on June 4, 2021.

See also
 Claws of the Panda, 2019 book about Chinese government influence in Canada.
Stealth War, 2019 book about Chinese government influence in the United States

References 

2018 non-fiction books
Anti-Chinese sentiment in Australia
Anti-communism in Australia
Australian non-fiction books
Books by Clive Hamilton
Books about international relations
Australia–China relations